William Dawson may refer to:

Politicians
 William Johnston Dawson (1765–1796/8), U.S. Representative from North Carolina
 William L. Dawson (politician) (1886–1970), U.S. Representative from Illinois
 William M. O. Dawson (1853–1916), Governor of West Virginia
 William Dawson (diplomat) (1885–1972), career United States diplomat
 William A. Dawson (1903–1981), U.S. Representative from Utah
 William Crosby Dawson (1798–1856), United States Senator from Georgia
 William Curran Dawson (1818–1893), Alabama politician, soldier
 William Dawson (Missouri politician) (1848–1929), U.S. Representative from Missouri
 William Dawson (mayor) (1825–1901), mayor of St. Paul, Minnesota
 William McDonell Dawson (1822–1890), member of the Legislative Assembly for Canada East
 William Dawson (New Zealand politician) (1852–1923), New Zealand politician for Dunedin Suburbs
 William Eddison Dawson (1829–1902), English-born businessman and political figure on Prince Edward Island

Other people
 William Dawson (college president) (1704?–1752), second president of the College of William & Mary
 William Dawson (sportsman) (1850–1916), English cricketer and rugby union player
 William "Red" Dawson (born 1942), American football player
 William Harbutt Dawson (1860–1948), British writer
 William James Dawson (1854–1928), English clergyman and author
 William L. Dawson (composer) (1899–1990), African-American composer
 William Francis Dawson (died 1829), road builder in British Ceylon, present-day Sri Lanka
 William Henderson Dawson (died 1879), Tyneside poet, songwriter, author and bookbinder
 William Leon Dawson (1873–1928), American ornithologist, author and lecturer
 William Dawson (ornithologist) (1927–2020), American ornithologist

See also
 John William Dawson (1820–1899), Canadian geologist and Principal of McGill University
 Bill Dawson (disambiguation)